Cerro El Plomo is a mountain in the Andes near Santiago, Chile. With an elevation of 5,434 m (17,783 ft), it is the largest peak visible from Santiago on clear days. The adequate season to climb this mountain is between November and March. In spring (September to November), soil conditions have abundant snow on the approach. The best time is in January and March, where the approach is snow free, except for some specific areas, and the climate is more stable. The Incas climbed to its summit periodically in the 15th century. The first European ascent of the mountain was by Gustav Brandt and Rudolph Lucke in 1896.

During a flight from Santiago, Chile, to Mendoza, Argentina, on 16 July 1932, the Pan American-Grace Airways (Panagra) Ford Trimotor San José crashed on Cerro El Plomo during a severe snowstorm, killing all nine people on board. Buried in ice and snow, its wreckage remained undiscovered until March 1934.

Mummy

The mountain was used as a ceremonial site by the Incas. The mountain achieved its fame in 1954 when a mummy of an approximately nine-year-old child was found on the summit. The mummy resides in the Museo Nacional de Historia Natural in Santiago, Chile.

Gallery

References

External links
Description of Cerro El Plomo expedition route
Description of the ascent route to El Plomo in Wikiexplora
Andeshandbook: complete description, history, place name and routes of Cerro Plomo

Mountains of Santiago Metropolitan Region
Five-thousanders of the Andes